Robert Downs may refer to:

 Robert B. Downs (1903–1991), American librarian and author
 Bob Downs (born 1955), British cyclist